Ferens is a surname. Notable people with the surname include:

 Stan Ferens (1915–1994), American baseball player
 Thomas Ferens (1847–1930), British politician, philanthropist, and industrialist
 Wojciech Ferens (born 1991), Polish volleyball player

See also
 Ryś-Ferens